Japanese Shinju can mean the following things:

Shinjū (心中), double suicide
Shinju (真珠), pearl
Shinjū (novel), a 1994 fiction book by Laura Joh Rowland
Shinju, a traditional Japanese breast bondage technique